Shaodong is a county-level city in the Province of Hunan, China, it is under the administration of Shaoyang City. Located in the central Hunan, the city is bordered to the northeast by Shuangfeng County, to the northwest by Xinshao County, to the east by Shuangqing, Beihu and Beita Districts of Shaoyang, to the south by Qidong County, to the southeast by Hengyang County. The county has three subdistricts, 18 towns and four townships under its jurisdiction, the county seat is Dahetang Subdistrict.

Administrative divisions
3 subdistricts
 Dahetang
 Liangshitang
 Songjiaping

18 towns
 Heitianpu
 Huochangping
 Huochaqiao
 Jianjialong
 Jieling
 Jiulongling
 Lianqiao
 Lingguandian
 Liuguangling
 Liuze
 Niumasi
 Shashi
 Shetianqiao
 Shuidongjiang
 Tuanshan
 Weijiaqiao
 Yangqiao
 Yejiping

4 townships
 Baomianqian
 Shuangfeng
 Zhouguanqiao
 Zhuoshicao

Climate

Transportation
Shandong railway station on the Huaihua–Shaoyang–Hengyang railway and the Luoyang–Zhanjiang railway is located here.

References 

www.xzqh.org

External links

 
County-level divisions of Hunan
Shaoyang